opened in Minamisatsuma, Kagoshima Prefecture, Japan, in 2004. The collection includes the Important Cultural Property Eight Aspects of the Buddha's Parinirvana.

See also
 Reimeikan, Kagoshima Prefectural Center for Historical Material
 List of Historic Sites of Japan (Kagoshima)
 List of Cultural Properties of Japan - paintings (Kagoshima)
 List of Cultural Properties of Japan - historical materials (Kagoshima)

References

Museums in Kagoshima Prefecture
Museums established in 2004
2004 establishments in Japan
Minamisatsuma, Kagoshima